Niels Foerts (born 17 October 1997) is a Belgian professional basketball player who last played for Feyenoord Basketball of the BNXT League.

Professional career
Foerts started his professional career in 2015, with Phoenix Brussels of the Pro Basketball League (PBL). He played there for six seasons and averaged a career-high 4.6 points per game in the 2020–21 season. In the summer of 2021, Foerts departed from Brussels after six seasons. On 4 July 2021, Foerts signed with Feyenoord Basketball.

Awards and accomplishments
FIBA Europe Cup Fan Vote Young Player of the Year: (2018)

References

1997 births
Living people
Belgian men's basketball players
Brussels Basketball players
Dutch Basketball League players
Feyenoord Basketball players
Point guards
Sportspeople from Antwerp